Kia Kola (also Romanized as Kīā Kolā, Kīā Kalā, and Kīyā Kalā) is a village in Lavij Rural District, Chamestan District, Nur County, Mazandaran Province, Iran. At the 2006 census, its population was 784, in 186 families.

References 

Populated places in Nur County